Academicians are distinguished members of the National Academy of Science and Technology (abbreviated as NAST), the highest recognition and scientific advisory body of the Philippines. The first Academicians were appointed in 1978 by President Ferdinand E. Marcos. Possible members are distinguished scientists in their own field which are nominated by members of the scientific community. The current NAST members deliberate on the membership of an individual following strict rules and regulations. From their ranks, the next National Scientist of the Philippines would be nominated and approved by the President of the Philippines.

Notes:

References 
 

Education in the Philippines
Academicians of the Philippines
Department of Science and Technology (Philippines)